Worship is the thirteenth studio album by Swedish death metal band Hypocrisy. It was released on 26 November 2021, eight years after End of Disclosure. It is the first metal album to be launched into space. Music videos for "Worship," "Chemical Whore," "Children of the Gray," and "Dead World" were made. This would be the last album with drummer Reidar "Horgh" Horghagen who left the band in April 2022.

Track listing

Personnel
Hypocrisy
 Peter Tägtgren – guitars, vocals, mixing, recording
 Mikael Hedlund – bass, songwriting (2, 7)
 Reidar "Horgh" Horghagen – drums, songwriting (2, 11)

Other Personnel
 Blake Armstrong – cover art
 Sebastian Tägtgren – songwriting (track 4)
 Marcelo Vasco – layout
 Hannah Verbeuren – photography
 Svante Forsbäck – mastering

Charts

References

2021 albums
Hypocrisy (band) albums
Nuclear Blast albums
Albums produced by Peter Tägtgren